The Big Night is a 1951 American film noir directed by Joseph Losey, that features John Drew Barrymore (credited as "John Barrymore, Jr." in his first starring role), Preston Foster and Joan Lorring. The feature is based on a script written by Joseph Losey and Stanley Ellin, based on Ellin's 1948 novel Dreadful Summit.  Hugo Butler and Ring Lardner, Jr. also contributed to the screenplay, but were uncredited when the film was first released. Robert Aldrich, who had been an assistant director on other films directed by Losey, also has a brief uncredited appearance in a scene at a boxing match.

Plot
On his 17th birthday, shy and bespectacled "Georgie" LaMain (John Barrymore, Jr.), is dared by classmates to kiss a girl, which he is reluctant to do.  At his father Andy's (Preston Foster) bar, beneath a sign warning "No Minors Allowed," George asks if Andy's girlfriend, Frances, will be there too, but Andy is evasive. George is presented with a birthday cake but fails to blow out all the candles.  Unexpectedly, influential sports columnist Al Judge (Howard St. John), who walks with a cane, enters the bar and orders George's father to strip off his shirt and kneel.  Andy passively complies, and Judge savagely beats him with his cane. Andy will not explain why he submitted to the pain and humiliation, and his bartender Flanagan (Howard Chamberlin) urges George to let the issue lie.  However, as Flanagan assists Andy, George takes some of his father's clothes to look more adult, as well as his father's gun, and leaves.

Stopping briefly at a nearby pharmacy, George is asked by the druggist to look after a baby for a moment, where George poses with the gun in front of a mirror.  With no clear direction to take, George begins a night journey, going first to a boxing match that he and his father were to attend to celebrate his birthday, hoping that he will find Al Judge there.  At the arena, George sells his father's ticket but is accused of ticket scalping by a conman (Emile Meyer) posing as a police officer, who takes the ticket money.  Inside the arena, the man who bought the ticket, Professor Cooper (Philip Bourneuf), a journalism teacher, explains what happened and shares his disgust of Al Judge.

Cooper takes George to one of Judge's haunts, where George encounters the conman who robbed him and wins a fight with him. At another club, he also meets Cooper's girlfriend Julie (Dorothy Comingore) and her sister Marion (Joan Lorring) and has his first drink. George is entranced by a Black singer (Mauri Leighton, credited as Mauri Lynn) and tries to compliment the singer as they leave, but he uses an unintentionally racist phrase that he regrets.

At Julie's apartment, George passes out but wakes to find that Marion has been watching him.  She expresses sympathy and concern and the two kiss, but George reacts hostilely and leaves when he finds that Marion had tried to hide his gun. At Judge's newspaper, he learns the journalist's address and goes there to confront him.  Facing George's gun, Judge explains that he had punished Andy because Frances, the missing girlfriend at the birthday party, was his sister and that she had killed herself when Andy would not marry her. George cannot bring himself to shoot Judge, but the writer attacks him and in the struggle, Judge is shot.  George seeks shelter with Marion and Cooper for a while, but when he returns to the bar, he sees that police have come to arrest his father for Judge's shooting.  Afraid and confused and still holding the gun, George confesses but learns that Judge was only wounded.  His father explains that he had not been able to marry Frances because was still married to George's mother, who had run off with another man. Andy had not wanted his son to grow up hating his mother. He persuades George to surrender the gun, and the two, professing their love for each other, go away with the police.

Cast

 John Barrymore, Jr. as George La Main
 Preston Foster as Andy La Main
 Joan Lorring as Marion Rostina
 Howard St. John as Al Judge
 Dorothy Comingore as Julie Rostina
 Philip Bourneuf as Dr. Lloyd Cooper
 Howland Chamberlin as Flanagan
 Myron Healey as Patrolman Kennealy
 Emil Meyer as Peckinpaugh
 Mauri Leighton as Terry Angelus

Reception

Critical response
When the film was released, film critic Bosley Crowther, panned the drama, writing, "Not only is the story presumptuous and contrived, without any clarification of character or theme, but it is directed by Joseph Losey in a provokingly ostentatious style and it is played by a cast of professionals as though it were an exercise at dramatic school. Preston Foster is funereal as the father, Howard St. John is insolent as the man who beats him up. Philip Bourneuf is bleary as a bibulous professor and Joan Lorring is sugary as a benevolent girl. Apparently everybody was concerned with theatrical effects and forgot all about a story with point and intelligence."  Similarly, Variety's review criticized the "muddled script" and disliked the low-key lighting and "obscure" scenes that would be evoked by later critics as hallmarks of film noir style.

Seen in the light of film noir, Losey's career, and reconsiderations of the political elements of older films, The Big Night has fared much better with critics.  Richard Brody, writing in The New Yorker, refers to the film as "an obscure gem" that "displays the sort of scathing critique of American society that, at the time of its release, led to trouble," claiming that it "reveals the period’s rank ideological foundations—an undercurrent of ethnic and racial hatred and an entrenched mythology of masculinity that gives rise to secrets, lies, and violence. Losey’s nerve-jangling style matches the subject: his images’ crisscrossing and striated lines evoke George's unresolved tangle of conscience and identity."

References

External links
 
 
 

1951 films
1951 drama films
American drama films
American black-and-white films
1950s English-language films
Film noir
Films based on American novels
Films directed by Joseph Losey
Films scored by Lyn Murray
Films with screenplays by Ring Lardner Jr.
United Artists films
1950s American films